The finals competition of the men's 10 metre platform synchronized was held on June 5, the fourth day of the 2010 FINA Diving World Cup.

Results

Green denotes finalists

2010 FINA Diving World Cup